Laxmikant Kattimani (born 3 May 1989) is an Indian association footballer who plays for Hyderabad as a goalkeeper.

Club career 
Born in Goa, Kattimani started his senior professional career with local club Vasco in 2008. In the following year, he switched to another Goan club Dempo and went on to represent the club for seven years. He won the I-League twice (2009–10 and 2011–12) with the side.

On 24 July 2014, Kattimani was drafted by Goa for their first even Indian Super League campaign. He was retained by the franchise in the following year. He featured for the club in the final match against Chennaiyin, which FC Goa lost by 3–2. He scored an own goal in the final minutes of the match.

Kattimani returned to Dempo for the 2015–16 I-League 2nd Division campaign and went on to win promotion to the I-League. Followingly he returned to FC Goa for the 2016 Indian Super League season. In December 2016, he joined I-League club Mumbai on a loan deal.

On 5 July 2017, Goa announced that they had retained Kattimani, who signed a three year contract with the franchise.

International career
Kattimani was included in the India under-23 team which won the 2009 SAFF Championship.
He further represented the youth squad which competed in the 2010 Asian Games.

On 5 July 2011, India national football team manager Armando Colaco called him to the squad for friendlies against Maldives and Qatar.

Honours 

India U23
 SAFF Championship: 2009
 South Asian Games Silver medal: 2016

Dempo
I-League: 2009–10, 2011–12

FC Goa
Indian Super Cup: 2019

Hyderabad
Indian Super League: 2021–22

References

External links

Footballers from Goa
Living people
1989 births
I-League players
Vasco SC players
Dempo SC players
Indian Super League players
FC Goa players
Association football goalkeepers
India youth international footballers
Footballers at the 2010 Asian Games
Indian footballers
Asian Games competitors for India
Mumbai FC players
Hyderabad FC players
South Asian Games silver medalists for India
South Asian Games medalists in football